Karsten Thielker (12 November 1965 – 3 October 2020) was a German Pulitzer Prize–winning photographer and journalist. He focused primarily on exhibition design, photography and photojournalism.

Life
He was born on 12 November 1965 in Bensberg in West Germany. He died on 3 October 2020 of esophageal cancer in Berlin.

Work biography
Initially, he was interested in travel photography; but an assignment by Associated Press to cover the Yugoslavian War drove him to war genre. He saw it as an opportunity to travel and to check his possible reactions in extreme situations, so he seized it: his career on conflict zones had started. 

Thielker´s most famous work is a photograph of Rwandan refugees carrying water back to a camp in Tanzania that won him a Pulitzer Prize in 1995. At that time, he reported the Hutus and Tutsis overwhelming civil war together with Jaqueline Artz, Javier Bauluz and Jean-Marc Bouju. 

His works have been exhibited in various European countries, in Mexico and in Nigeria and he has also conducted workshops for the Goethe Institute in Laos, Nigeria, and Guadalajara, México.
   
Thielker worked for the Rhein-Zeitung from 1981 to 1990, and for the Associated Press from 1990 to 1996 and as a freelance photographer from Berlin since 1997. He is known to be one of those photo journalists who have worked surrounded by confrontations with death, ethical issues and the consequences they witness when they report from conflict zones.

Thielker also performed consultancy for the daily newspaper Tageszeitung and for Internet Image Database (www.piaxa.com).

Awards
1995: Pulitzer Prize.
2002: Platz Rückblende.

References

External links
 Official site

2020 deaths
1965 births
German journalists
German male journalists
German male writers